Line 400 is one of CFR's main lines in Romania having a total length of . The main line, connecting Brașov with the northwestern city Satu Mare, passes through the important cities Sfântu Gheorghe, Miercurea Ciuc, Dej, Jibou and Baia Mare.

Secondary lines

References

Railway lines in Romania
Standard gauge railways in Romania
Transport in Satu Mare